The military of China refers to the People's Liberation Army of the People's Republic of China.

Military of China may also refer to:

People's Liberation Army Hong Kong Garrison
People's Liberation Army Macau Garrison
Republic of China Armed Forces (ROC since 1947, on Taiwan since 1949)
National Revolutionary Army (national army of China between 1928 and 1947)

Chinese military before 1912
Military history of China (pre-1911)
Eight Banners
Green Standard Army

See also
Chinese Army (disambiguation)
People's Liberation Army (disambiguation)